Charles Booth, D.C.L. (died 1535) was a sixteenth-century clergyman who served as the Bishop of Hereford from 1516 to 1535.

Ecclesiastical career
Prior to his episcopal appointment he held a number of ecclesiastical posts. The first of those was as the Treasurer of Lichfield Cathedral from 1495 to 1516. He was also appointed to three prebendaries at Lincoln Cathedral: Clifton (1501–1504), Farndon-cum-Balderton (1504–1516), and Reculversland (c.1507–1516). During that period, he was also the Archdeacon of Buckingham from 1505 to 1516.

He was nominated bishop of the diocese of Hereford by King Henry VIII on 22 April 1516 and appointed by papal provision on 21 July 1516. His consecration to the Episcopate took place on 30 November 1516. He was enthroned at Hereford Cathedral in January 1517 and received possession of the temporalities of the see on 19 February 1517.

He died in office on 5 May 1535.

References

Bibliography

 
 
 
 
 

1535 deaths
Archdeacons of Buckingham
Bishops of Hereford
16th-century English Roman Catholic bishops
Year of birth unknown